Hifumi (written: 一二三) is a unisex Japanese given name. Notable people with the name include:

, Japanese judoka
, Japanese shogi player
, Japanese classical composer
Hifumi Suzuki (born 1957), Japanese Paralympic archer

Fictional characters
, a character in the manga series Koi Koi Seven
, a character in the multimedia project Hypnosis Mic: Division Rap Battle
, a character in the manga series New Game!
, a character in the video game Persona 5
Hifumi Yamada (山田 一二三), a character in the visual novel Danganronpa: Trigger Happy Havoc

Japanese unisex given names